Bachu Akagbe is a village in Cameroon located in the department of Manyu and the South West Region. It is part of Upper Bayang district. It is also a ward or chiefdom.

People 
In 1953, the locality had 426 inhabitants, then 992 in 1967, mainly Kenyang People.

During the 2005 census, there were counted.

Education 
Bachuo Akagbe has a public undergraduate technical establishment (CETIC).

References

Southwest Region (Cameroon)